Hedworth Lambton (26 March 1797 – 16 September 1876) was a Liberal Party politician in the United Kingdom.  He was Member of Parliament (MP) for North Durham from 1832 to 1847.

References

External links 
 

1797 births
1876 deaths
Liberal Party (UK) MPs for English constituencies
UK MPs 1832–1835
UK MPs 1835–1837
UK MPs 1837–1841
UK MPs 1841–1847